Louis Henri may refer to:

 Louis Henri, Prince of Condé (1756–1830)
 Louis Henri, Duke of Bourbon (1692–1740)